Salinirubrum litoreum is a halophilic archaeon in the family of Halobacteriaceae and the only described species in the genus Salinirubrum (common abbreviation Srr.).

References

Halobacteria
Monotypic archaea genera
Archaea genera
Taxa described in 2014

Archaea described in 2014